Walter Skocik (born 6 September 1940 in Schwechat) is a former Austrian international footballer and football manager.

External links 
 
 
 Profile - Rapidarchiv

1940 births
Living people
People from Schwechat
Association football midfielders
Austrian footballers
Austria international footballers
SK Rapid Wien players
FC Wacker Innsbruck players
Austrian Football Bundesliga players
Austrian football managers
Austrian expatriate football managers
SK Rapid Wien managers
UD Las Palmas managers
Athlitiki Enosi Larissa F.C. managers
PAOK FC managers
FK Austria Wien managers
LASK managers
Ethnikos Piraeus F.C. managers
Apollon Smyrnis F.C. managers
Wiener Sport-Club managers
First Vienna FC managers
Ittihad FC managers
AC Omonia managers
FC Fribourg players
FC Fribourg managers
Footballers from Lower Austria
WSG Tirol players
Expatriate footballers in Switzerland
Austrian expatriate sportspeople in Switzerland
Expatriate football managers in Spain
Expatriate football managers in Switzerland
Expatriate football managers in Saudi Arabia
Expatriate football managers in Greece
Expatriate football managers in Cyprus
Austrian expatriate sportspeople in Cyprus
Austrian expatriate sportspeople in Spain
Austrian expatriate sportspeople in Greece
Austrian expatriate sportspeople in Saudi Arabia
FC Tirol Innsbruck managers